The discography of Tinchy Stryder, a recording artist whose real name is Kwasi Danquah, consists of four studio albums, one compilation album (with Roll Deep), one collaboration album, five extended plays, four mixtapes (including one with Roll Deep), 17 singles (including one promotional single, and one other charted single), five singles as a featured artist (including two charity singles), and ten collaborations. Danquah has sold over 22.2 million digital singles worldwide. Danquah performed under the stage name Stryder from 1997 to 2006, and has performed under the stage name Tinchy Stryder since 2006.

Danquah is a recording artist who throughout his music career mainly practiced the grime music genre from 2002 to 2007, and was a member of the grime group Roll Deep. In 2002, the grime group Roll Deep was formed, and included Danquah and Dizzee Rascal. They were making music that was a derivative of garage. For a while, there was not even a name for it. The label "grime" was the one that stuck.

In 2007, Danquah released his debut solo studio album, Star in the Hood, on the independent record label Takeover Entertainment—a partner of Live Nation—in August 2007. This album spawned two main singles, "Breakaway", which was released on 9 April 2007 and "Something About Your Smile", released on 6 August 2007. Bonus track "Mainstream Money" was also released as an underground single in November 2007.

In 2009, Danquah released his second solo studio album, Catch 22, which was mainly influenced by the electronic and alternative hip hop genres. He released his second single from the album, Catch 22, entitled "Take Me Back" with English singer Taio Cruz, which peaked at number 3 on the UK Singles Chart in January 2009. He then released the song "Number 1" (a collaboration with English band N-Dubz), which entered the European Hot 100 at number 6, on April 26, 2009. Danquah later released "Never Leave You" with English singer Amelle Berrabah, which entered the European Hot 100 at number 5, on August 9, 2009.

In 2010, Danquah released his third solo studio album, Third Strike, an electronic dance music studio album. On BBC Radio 1's Chart Show, it was revealed that the song "Number 1" is the first song in chart history anywhere in the world entitled "Number 1" ever to actually reach #1.

Albums

Studio albums

Collaboration albums

Mixtapes

Extended plays

Singles

As lead artist

As featured artist

Charity singles

Promotional singles

Other charted songs

Collaborations

See also
 List of songs recorded by Tinchy Stryder
 Tinchy Stryder videography
 Takeover Entertainment discography

Notes

References

Sources

External links

Hip hop discographies